In music, a transformation consists of any operation or process that may apply to a musical variable (usually a set or tone row in twelve tone music, or a melody or chord progression in tonal music), or rhythm in composition, performance, or analysis. Transformations include multiplication, rotation, permutation (i.e. transposition, inversion, and retrograde), prolation (augmentation, diminution) and combinations thereof.

Transformations may also be applied to simpler or more complex variables such as interval and spectrum or timbre.

See also
 Identity (music)
 Operation (music)
 Permutation (music)
 Transformational theory

References

Musical techniques